PWZ-029 is a benzodiazepine derivative drug with nootropic effects developed by WiSys, It acts as a subtype-selective, mixed agonist-inverse agonist at the benzodiazepine binding site on the GABAA receptor, acting as a partial inverse agonist at the α5 subtype and a weak partial agonist at the α3 subtype. This gives it a mixed pharmacological profile, producing at low doses memory-enhancing effects but with no convulsant or anxiogenic effects or muscle weakness, although at higher doses it produces some sedative effects.

See also
 GABAA receptor negative allosteric modulator
 GABAA receptor § Ligands
 GL-II-73

References

Chloroarenes
Ethers
GABAA receptor negative allosteric modulators
Imidazobenzodiazepines
Lactams
Nootropics